Andrew David Townsend (born 23 July 1963) is a former professional footballer and sports co-commentator for Premier League Productions and CBS Sports.

As a player he was a midfielder who notably played in the Premier League for Chelsea, Aston Villa and Middlesbrough. He also played in the Football League for Southampton, Norwich City and West Bromwich Albion. Prior to his professional career he had spent four years in Non-League with Welling United. Despite being born in England, Townsend played in World Cups for the Republic of Ireland national team, making 70 appearances and scoring seven goals.

Following retirement, Townsend moved into sports commentary and was ITV Sport's co-commentator for all of their major coverage of games until 2015. He has also commentated for BT Sport, Talksport and BBC Radio 5 Live.

Early life
Townsend was born in Maidstone, Kent, but grew up in Bexley, where he attended Upton Primary School in Bexleyheath, followed by Bexleyheath School.

Club career
He began his playing career in August 1980 with Welling United in the Athenian League, while working as a computer operator for Greenwich Borough Council in south-east London. After making 105 appearances for Welling, he was signed by Weymouth in March 1984 for £13,500.

In January 1985, he was signed by Lawrie McMenemy at Southampton for £35,000 and made his professional debut at home to Aston Villa on 20 April 1985 as Southampton qualified for Europe, only to be banned in the aftermath of the Heysel Stadium disaster.

Over the next season, he was in and out of the team (then managed by Chris Nicholl) but broke his leg in a pre-season friendly against his old club Weymouth in August 1986. He fought his way back to fitness and rejoined the side the following January.

In the 1987–88 he was a virtual ever-present, playing alongside Jimmy Case and Glenn Cockerill in the Southampton midfield. He was a hard-tackling, hard-working midfielder with an eye for goal. It was a shock, therefore, when Nicholl sold him to First Division rivals Norwich City in August 1988, for a fee of £300,000.

He made his debut as a substitute against Middlesbrough on 3 September 1988, before replacing the suspended Trevor Putney for his first full appearance in a 3–1 win over Spurs on 22 October. He retained his place in the Norwich midfield and ended the season with 36 league appearances (5 as substitute) with five goals. He also made six FA Cup appearances with two goals against Port Vale in the Third Round on 7 January 1989. Under manager Dave Stringer, he was a member of the Canaries''' 1988–89 side that finished fourth in the top flight and reached the semi-finals of the FA Cup. At the season's end, Townsend was shortlisted for the PFA Players' Player of the Year award, which was won by Mark Hughes.

Norwich made a handsome profit when they let Townsend join Chelsea for £1,200,000 in July 1990.

After making a total of 138 appearances for Chelsea, scoring 12 goals but winning no trophies (they never finished higher than 11th in the league while he was there), he transferred to Aston Villa in July 1993 for £2.1million.

He finally won some silverware when Villa won the 1994 League Cup, beating Manchester United 3–1. He captained Villa when they reclaimed the trophy in 1996 with a 3–0 victory over Leeds United.

In August 1997, just after the start of the 1997–98 season, he transferred to Bryan Robson's Middlesbrough for £500,000 having made 134 league appearances for the Villans, scoring eight league goals.

He made 37 appearances in his first season on Teesside, scoring twice as Boro won promotion to the Premier League. In the 1998–99 season, he formed a useful partnership with Paul Gascoigne as Middlesbrough finished comfortably in mid-table in their first season back in the Premier League.

In the following season, he found it harder to get into the first team and on 17 September 1999 he moved down a division to West Bromwich Albion for £50,000. Townsend's high wage demands prevented a move back to Norwich or a loan spell with non-league Boston United.

In his one season at West Bromwich Albion he only made 17 league appearances before a recurrent knee injury forced his retirement in July 2000, after a season in which Albion narrowly avoided relegation to Division Two.

On 21 April 2016, Townsend joined Bolton Wanderers as a consultant.

International career
His contribution to Norwich's successful season saw Townsend selected for the Republic of Ireland, making his debut against France in February 1989. He qualified for Ireland due to his Irish family heritage.'

He played in the next year's World Cup, in Italy, where he played in all five of Ireland's matches. They reached the quarter-finals, the country's strongest ever campaign. The Irish drew their three group matches – against England, Egypt and the Netherlands. Scoring a penalty in the shoot-out with Romania, his country were eventually sunk by a Salvatore Schillaci goal for the hosts. They had conceded just three goals in those five games.

He was captain of the Ireland squad for the 1994 World Cup. All four teams of Group E finished on four points, they got their revenge on the Italians, but were defeated by Mexico and drew with Norway. Ireland lost 2–0 to the Dutch at the Citrus Bowl in the knock-out stage.

On 22 March 2015, Townsend was inducted into the FAI Hall of Fame.

Broadcasting career

 ITV Sport 
Townsend's most prominent role was as part of ITV Sport's live Champions League, FA Cup and England internationals coverage. He took over from Ron Atkinson as the channel's lead co-commentator, forming a long-running partnership with main commentator Clive Tyldesley, as well as appearing as a studio pundit. He co-hosted Talksport's Weekend Sports Breakfast on Sundays with Mike Parry, and hosted the station's drive-time show on Fridays. He also hosted the mid morning discussion on talkSPORT from 10am to 1pm from Monday to Friday, having replaced Jon Gaunt, who was sacked for calling a guest a Nazi. He left the station because he no longer wanted to commute from his Midlands home to the London studio. He also hosts ITV1's regional programme Soccer Night, alongside Peter Beagrie. Townsend was part of ITV's coverage of the Premier League after they won the rights from the BBC to show top flight football on Saturday evening. In January 2015 ITV confirmed that Townsend, along with presenter Adrian Chiles, would not be retained by the broadcaster after the expiry of his contract in the summer of 2015, with the channel having lost Champions League broadcasting rights.

BT Sport
After leaving ITV in 2015 he joined BT Sport as a co-commentator for their coverage of the Premier League, FA Cup, UEFA Champions League and UEFA Europa League. He made his co-commentating debut on 15 February 2015, co-commentating on Arsenal vs Middlesbrough in the FA Cup fifth round alongside Ian Darke.

Other work
He has also presented BBC Radio 5 Live and written columns for the Daily Mail. He has also been the commentator on several EA football games with Clive Tyldesley including 2006 FIFA World Cup, UEFA Champions League 2006-2007, UEFA Euro 2008, 2010 FIFA World Cup South Africa, UEFA Euro 2012, 2014 FIFA World Cup Brazil and most recently FIFA 12 to this game FIFA 17.

Personal life
He is the son of former Charlton Athletic and Crystal Palace defender Don Townsend.

Business interests
Townsend was a consultant for Harlequin Property, where he helps set up football schools at their Caribbean resorts. The company's proposed investment into Port Vale had set in motion plans for him to become a football advisor at the club, though nothing was to come of these talks.

Charitable activities
He is patron of the George Coller Memorial Fund. He ran in the Great North Run in 2007, finishing in a time of 2 hours and 20 minutes.

HonoursAston Villa Football League Cup: 1993–94, 1995–96Middlesbrough Football League First Division runner-up: 1997–98
 Football League Cup runner-up: 1997–98Individual'''
 Norwich City Hall of Fame
PFA Team of the Year: 1988–89 First Division, 1990–91 First Division, 1991–92 First Division 
 Chelsea Player of the Year: 1990–91
 FAI Hall of Fame: Inducted 2015
 FAI Senior International Player of the Year: 1995

References

External links

Republic of Ireland profile
Profile at talkSPORT
Profile at The Gordon Poole Agency

Living people
1963 births
English association football commentators
Sportspeople from Maidstone
Footballers from Bexleyheath
Republic of Ireland association footballers
Republic of Ireland international footballers
Republic of Ireland B international footballers
Welling United F.C. players
Weymouth F.C. players
Southampton F.C. players
Norwich City F.C. players
Chelsea F.C. players
Aston Villa F.C. players
Middlesbrough F.C. players
West Bromwich Albion F.C. players
1990 FIFA World Cup players
1994 FIFA World Cup players
English people of Irish descent
English Football League players
Premier League players
Daily Mail journalists
English radio personalities
Association football midfielders